This is a list of Odia films that are released in 2020.

List of Odia films produced in the Ollywood in India that are released in the year 2020.

Films

References

Lists of 2020 films by country or language

Lists of Ollywood films by year